Predrag Pajić (born January 20, 1993) is a Macedonian professional basketball Shooting guard who currently plays for Akademija FMP in the Macedonian First League.

External links

References

1993 births
Sportspeople from Skopje
Macedonian men's basketball players
Living people
Macedonian people of Serbian descent
Shooting guards